The Archaeological Museum of Sifnos is a museum, in the village of Kastro on Sifnos (the capital of the island since the Archaic period until 1836), in Greece. Its collections include exhibits dating from the early  Bronze Age to the late Byzantine period. There are mostly local finds.

The building of the museum belongs to the medieval nucleus of the Kastro. It was restored by the Greek Ministry of Culture and opened to the public in 1986.

External links

 Hellenic Ministry of Culture and Tourism
 Archaeological Museum of Sifnos on www.greeka.com

 Sifnos
Sifnos
1986 establishments in Greece